SEK (Sidirodromoi Ellinikou Kratous, Hellenic State Railways) class Μα (or class Ma; Mu-alpha) was a class of 2-10-2 steam locomotives built by Ansaldo and Breda in 1953. They were numbered Μα 1001-1020.

The Μα locomotives were the last steam locomotives acquired by SEK before conversion to diesel traction. They were designed and built in Italy by Breda (10 units) and Ansaldo (10 units) in 1953–1954, while some parts (including whole tender underframes) were made by Nuove Reggiane. The length of the locomotive with the tender was 24.93 m, the maximum height 4.51 m and service weight 136 tn. The boiler operated at 18 bar and their rated power was 2950 hp. Maximum speed was 90 km/h.

Due to various technical problems, only two years after introduction they were modified by Henschel (1957–1958). The boilers were converted to burn heavy fuel oil.

These locomotives were based at Aghios Ioannis Rentis and Thessaloniki depots and were used mainly for freight trains and for some express passenger trains on Piraeus–Thessaloniki and Thessaloniki–Idomeni mainlines until the early 1970s, when they were withdrawn by the Hellenic Railways Organisation (successor of SEK) due to complete conversion to diesel traction.

Only two examples survived the 1984-1985 steam locomotive scrappings. One of them, 1002 was set on display as part of the theatre "Το Τρένο στο Ρουφ" (="The Train at Rouf"), at Rouf station in Athens.

References

 G Handrinos & Tim Hills: "Αφιέρωμα Breda: Σειρά Μα 1001-1020", Σιδηροτροχιά, issue 35, pp. 29–43, June 2009

Μα
2-10-2 locomotives
Steam locomotives of Greece
Railway locomotives introduced in 1953
Gio. Ansaldo & C. locomotives
Breda locomotives
Standard gauge locomotives of Greece